Chembakasseril Balakrishna Warrier Chandrasekhara Warrier (30 October 1932 – 17 June 2013) was an Indian political leader of the Communist Party of India (Marxist) and a member of Kerala Legislative Assembly for 12 years. Known to the political circle as C. B. C., he was elected as a Member of Legislative Assembly in 4th and 6th term of Kerala State Legislative Assembly. He also had held positions of Chairman, Public Accounts Committee (1974–75) and Committee on Estimates (1980–82). He was also active in trade union movements.

Early life
He was born 30 October 1932, in Haripad, Alleppey, Kerala, India. He completed his schooling in Karuvatta NSS school, Haripad in 1947. Pre-university studies he completed in Trivandrum and he continued his higher studies at University College Trivandrum. During this period he was active in students movements and union elections in college.

Educational qualifications
Bachelor of Law (BL), Advocate

Positions held

 MLA Kerala Legislative Assembly (1967-1970) 
 MLA, Kerala Legislative Assembly (1970–77 and 1980–85)
 CPI(M) Parliamentary Party Secretary (1970–77)
 Member, Kerala University Senate
 C.I.T.U Working Committee, CPI (M) Alleppey District Committee
 President, Employees Unions of KFC, KSFE
 Agro Industries Corporation and other Trade Unions.

Election profile

Won
1970 Kerala Legislative Assembly Election - Won against Congress(I) candidate Thachadi Prabhakaran
1980 Kerala Legislative Assembly Election - Won against Congress (I) candidate G. P. Mangalathu Madam

Lost
1965 Kerala Legislative Assembly Election - Defeated by Congress(I) candidate K. P. Ramakrishnan Nair
1977 Kerala Legislative Assembly Election - Defeated by Congress(I) candidate G. P. Mangalathu Madam

References

External links
 Niyamasabha.com

1932 births
Communist Party of India (Marxist) politicians from Kerala
2013 deaths
People from Alappuzha district
Malayali politicians
Kerala MLAs 1967–1970
Kerala MLAs 1970–1977
Kerala MLAs 1980–1982